Events from the year 1945 in Michigan.

Top stories
The Associated Press polled editors of its member newspapers in Michigan and ranked the state's top news stories of 1945 as follows:
 The murder of State Senator Warren G. Hooper by shooting in his car near his home in Albion. Hooper was a witness in the corruption investigation of Leland W. Carr. Four Detroit men were convicted of conspiracy to commit the murder. (159 points)
 Labor unrest and a strike against General Motors (137 points)
 The expose by Attorney General John R. Dethmers of immorality, favoritism, and gambling at Jackson State Prison (124 points)
 The Detroit Tigers defeated the Chicago Cubs in seven games in the 1945 World Series. Hal Newhouser won the pitching triple crown (leading the American League in wins, strikeouts, and earned run average) and was named the American League Most Valuable Player for the second consecutive year. (101 points)
 Oakland County murders (94 points)
 Hamonic steamship fire (70 points)
 Post-war conversion (64 points)
 Re-election of Edward Jeffries as Mayor of Detroit (54 points)
 Governors' convention on Mackinac Island (29 points)
 Detroit boxing plant fire (26 points)

Office holders

State office holders

 Governor of Michigan: Harry Kelly (Republican)
 Lieutenant Governor of Michigan: Eugene C. Keyes (Republican)/Vernon J. Brown (Republican) 
 Michigan Attorney General: John R. Dethmers (Republican) 
 Michigan Secretary of State: Herman H. Dignan (Republican)
 Speaker of the Michigan House of Representatives: Howard Nugent (Republican)
 Chief Justice, Michigan Supreme Court:

Mayors of major cities

 Mayor of Detroit: Edward Jeffries (Republican)
 Mayor of Grand Rapids: George W. Welsh (Republican)
 Mayor of Flint: Edwin C. McLogan
 Mayor of Lansing: Ralph Crego
 Mayor of Saginaw: Eric F. Wieneke/Harold J. Stenglein

Federal office holders

 U.S. Senator from Michigan: Homer S. Ferguson (Republican)
 U.S. Senator from Michigan: Arthur Vandenberg (Republican) 
 House District 1: George G. Sadowski (Democrat)
 House District 2: Earl C. Michener (Republican)
 House District 3: Paul W. Shafer (Republican)
 House District 4: Clare Hoffman (Republican)
 House District 5: Bartel J. Jonkman (Republican)
 House District 6: William W. Blackney (Republican)
 House District 7: Jesse P. Wolcott (Republican)
 House District 8: Fred L. Crawford (Republican)
 House District 9: Albert J. Engel (Republican)
 House District 10: Roy O. Woodruff (Republican)
 House District 11: Frederick Van Ness Bradley (Republican)
 House District 12: Frank Eugene Hook (Democrat)
 House District 13: George D. O'Brien (Democrat)
 House District 14: Louis C. Rabaut (Democrat)
 House District 15: John D. Dingell Sr. (Democrat)
 House District 16: John Lesinski Sr. (Democrat)
 House District 17: George Anthony Dondero (Republican)

Population

Companies
The following is a list of major companies based in Michigan in 1945.

Sports

Baseball
 1945 Detroit Tigers season – The Tigers compiled an 88-65 record, won the American League pennant, led the league with attendance of 1,280,341, and defeated the Chicago Cubs in the 1945 World Series. Pitcher Hal Newhouser compiled a 25-9 record and a 1.81 earned run average and won the American League Most Valuable Player award for the second consecutive year. The team's other statistical leaders included Hank Greenberg with a .311 batting average and Roy Cullenbine with 90 RBIs.
 1945 Michigan Wolverines baseball season - Under head coach Ray Fisher, the Wolverines compiled a 20–1 record and won the Big Ten Conference championship. Don Lund was the team captain.

American football
 1945 Detroit Lions season – Under head coach Gus Dorais, the Lions compiled a 7–3 record and finished in second place in the NFL's Western Conference. The team's statistical leaders included Chuck Fenenbock with 754 passing yards, Bob Westfall with 234 rushing yards, and John Greene with 550 receiving yards. 
 1945 Michigan Wolverines football team – Under head coach was Fritz Crisler, the Wolverines compiled a 7–3 record and finished the season ranked No. 6 in the final AP Poll.
 1945 Michigan State Spartans football team – Under head coach Charlie Bachman, the Spartans compiled a 5–3–1 record.
 1945 Detroit Titans football team – Under head coach Chuck Baer, the Titans outscored their opponents by a combined total of 193 to 114 and compiled a 6–3 record.

Basketball
 1944–45 Michigan Wolverines men's basketball team – Under head coach Bennie Oosterbaan, the Wolverines compiled a 12–7 record. Robert Geahan was the team's leading scorer with 136 points in 19 games for an average of 7.2 points per game.
 1944–45 Michigan State Spartans men's basketball team – Under Benjamin Van Alstyne, the Spartans compiled a 9–7 record.
 1944–45 Western Michigan Broncos men's basketball team – Under head coach Buck Read, the Broncos compiled an 8–10 record.
 1944–45 Detroit Titans men's basketball team – Under head coach Lloyd Brazil, the Titans compiled an 8–12 record.

Ice hockey
 1944–45 Detroit Red Wings season – Under head coach Jack Adams, the Red Wings compiled a 31–14–5 record and finished second in the NHL. The team's statistical leaders included Joe Carveth with 26 goals and 54 points and Syd Howe with 36 assists. Harry Lumley was the team's principal goaltender.

Other
 Michigan Open - Chuck Kocsis won the tournament at Cascade Hills Country Club in Grand Rapids.
 Port Huron to Mackinac Boat Race –

Chronology of events

Births

 January 29 - Tom Selleck, actor (Magnum, P.I., Three Men and a Baby), in Detroit
 January 29 - Donna Caponi, professional golfer, winner of four major championships, and a member of the World Golf Hall of Fame, in Detroit
 February 26 - Mitch Ryder, musician and leader of Mitch Ryder & The Detroit Wheels ("Devil with a Blue Dress On"), in Detroit
 March 11 - Harvey Mandel, one of the first rock guitarists to use two-handed fretboard tapping, in Detroit
 March 29 - George Blaha, radio and television play-by-play voice of the Detroit Pistons since 1976, in Detroit
 March 31 - Mike Bass, cornerback for Washington Redskins (1969–1975), scored their only touchdown in Super Bowl VII, in Ypsilanti, Michigan
 May 6 - Bob Seger, singer-songwriter, guitarist and pianist ("Night Moves", "Old Time Rock and Roll"), in Detroit
 June 6 - David Bonior, U.S. Congressman (1977–2003) and whip (1991–2002), in Detroit
 June 25 - Carolyn Cheeks Kilpatrick, U.S. Congresswoman (1997–2011) and mother of Kwame Kilpatrick, in Detroit
 September 13 - Rick Wise, Major League Baseball pitcher (1980–1982) and 2× All-Star (1971, 1973), in Jackson, Michigan
 November 2 - J. D. Souther, musician, singer-songwriter ("Best of My Love", Heartache Tonight", and "You're Only Lonely"), and actor, in Detroit
 December 17 - Ernie Hudson, actor (Ghostbusters film series, HBO's Oz), in Benton Harbor, Michigan

Gallery of 1945 births

Deaths
 January 31 - Eddie Slovik, only American soldier to be court-martialled and executed for desertion since the American Civil War, at age 24 by execution in France
 May 21 - Horace B. Carpenter, actor, film director and, screenwriter, at age 70 in Hollywood
 October 3 - Truman Handy Newberry, U.S. Secretary of the Navy (1908–1909) and U.S. Senator (1919–1922), at age 80 in Detroit

See also
 History of Michigan
 History of Detroit

References